Berkshire County Cricket Club was formed in 1895, and first competed in the Minor Counties Championship in 1896.  They have appeared in thirty List A matches, making five Gillette Cup, seventeen NatWest Trophy and eight Cheltenham & Gloucester Trophy appearances.  The players in this list have all played at least one List A match.  Berkshire cricketers who have not represented the county in List A cricket are excluded from the list.

Players are listed in order of appearance, where players made their debut in the same match, they are ordered by batting order.  Players in bold have played first-class cricket.

Key

List of players

List A captains

References

Berkshire County Cricket Club
Cricketers
Berkshire